Samuel Mokriš (born 4 July 1990) is a Czech curler. He competed at the 2015 Ford World Men's Curling Championship in Halifax, Nova Scotia, Canada, as alternate for the Czech national curling team. He also competed at the 2012 World Men's Curling Championship. Mokriš regularly plays second for the Krystof Chaloupek rink.

References

External links

1990 births
Living people
Czech male curlers
Competitors at the 2017 Winter Universiade